How to Frame a Figg is a 1971 comedy film about a bookkeeper's bungling assistant, Hollis Alexander Figg (played by Don Knotts), in the Dalton city hall, who finds himself framed for embezzlement.

Plot
Hollis Figg is an earnest if not too bright man whose devoted friend is a local sanitation worker, and whose girlfriend is the equally earnest Ema Letha, a pretty waitress at the diner across the street from City Hall, where Figg works as an accountant. When the Mayor, his staff, and Mr. Spaulding, the richest man in town, decide they need more cover for their shameless skimming from the city's coffers, they fire three of the four accountants in the basement and replace them with a giant computer named LEO (Large-Capacity Enumerating Officiator), keeping Figg whom they deem the dimmest of the three to run the computer that he barely comprehends. When Figg unexpectedly (and quite accidentally) stumbles upon discrepancies in a road works budget, they promote him to the "third floor", distract him with a new Cadillac and a sexy assistant (Yvonne Craig) who is able to manipulate him into signing any form or check that she places on his desk. Of course the curvaceous secretary doesn't sit too well with Ema Letha either.

Sooner rather than later, the Assistant State Attorney General becomes suspicious of the activities of the Dalton City Council, and when he closes in, Figg, having signed everything, is the perfect patsy. Figg manages to avoid arrest by disguising himself as the mourning mother of the suddenly dead Mr. Spaulding, using the disguise to get into city hall to get the evidence he needs out of LEO, the computer, to clear his name. When he finds the memory bank of the computer (the size of a refrigerator) missing and the dead body of Spaulding in a closet, he deduces that the City Council has buried the memory bank in the coffin of the dead man. Figg and his loyal buddy sneak into the cemetery, exhume the coffin, and plug LEO in. But LEO explodes, spraying IBM cards everywhere. Figg discovers the cards are encoded with the evidence he needs to prove his innocence.

On their honeymoon in Rio de Janeiro, paid for by a grateful city, Ema and Figg bemoan the fact that the City Council got away before they could be arrested. Suddenly, the staff at the hotel look to Figg like the Mayor and his men, but Ema says he is only stressed and mistaken. As the two newlyweds moon over the view from their balcony, the Mayor and one of his cronies, disguised as hotel staff, can be seen removing the stiff corpse of Mr. Spaulding out of the closet on a dolly and wheeling him out of the room.

Cast

 Don Knotts as Hollis Alexander Figg 
 Joe Flynn as Kermit Sanderson 
 Edward Andrews as Mayor Robert Chrisholm 
 Elaine Joyce as Ema Letha Kusic 
 Yvonne Craig as Glorianna Hastings 
 Frank Welker as Prentiss Gates 
 Parker Fennelly as Old Charley Spaulding 
 Bill Zuckert as Commissioner Henderson 
 Pitt Herbert as Dr Schmidt 
 Robert P. Lieb as Commissioner Hayes 
 Bob Hastings as Chris Groat 
 Bruce Kirby as Dale Groat 
 Stuart Nisbet as Gentry Groat 
 James Millhollin as Funeral Director 
 Fay DeWitt as Grace 
 Savannah Bentley as Ethel Purvis 
 Athena Lorde as Agnes 
 Bill Quinn as Carmoni 
 John Archer as Gerard

See also
 List of American films of 1971

References

External links
 
 
 

1971 films
Universal Pictures films
Films directed by Alan Rafkin
1971 comedy films
Films scored by Vic Mizzy
Films with screenplays by George Tibbles
1970s English-language films
American comedy films
1970s American films